The Mahatma Gandhi Bus Station (MGBS), also known as the Imlibun Bus Station (Imlibun means "grove of tamarind trees"), is a bus station on the Musi River in the Imlibun area of southern Hyderabad, India. It is owned by the Telangana State Road Transport Corporation (TSRTC) and is India's third-largest bus station, covering , behind Chennai Mofussil Bus Terminus and Delhi's Millennium Park Bus Depot.

History
The bus station was built during the Nizam era, and was owned by the Nizam's Guaranteed State Railway and known as the Central Bus Station. It was built in the shape of a dome and was named Imlibun. It was a converted aircraft hangar, built during the 1930s by Butler and Company of the US to accommodate the Nizam’s fleet of public single- and double-decker buses. When the bus station was later expanded, the Musi River bed was partially filled for the new facility. Although it had been accessible by two major and two minor road bridges, it is presently accessible by one bridge.

Service
MGBS primarily serves Telangana and Andhra Pradesh, and has daily service to Chhattisgarh, Karnataka, Madhya Pradesh, Odisha, Maharashtra and Tamil Nadu.

Hyderabad Metro connectivity
The MGBS, Jubilee Bus Station (JBS), and the Hyderabad Metro's Green Line is  connecting Secunderabad and Hyderabad. Travel time between the cities will be 16 minutes, compared to 45 minutes by road. The Green Line has two connecting bus stations: the  Mahatma Gandhi Bus Station and the JBS Parade Ground. The MGBS station is India's largest metro station and Hyderabad's tallest; its corridorsCorridor 2 (JBS to MGBS) and Corridor 1 (Miyapur to LB Nagar)are on separate levels. According to the metro company, the station is designed for 100 years of service and its concourse will contain retail stores and entertainment.

Infrastructure
There are 150 platforms, a 7,380-square-meter waiting room, a 3,455-square-meter shopping complex and a 5,000-square-meter parking area.

Many TSRTC buses in Hyderabad use the station, one of two terminals in the city for long-distance bus service. Corporation buses include Palle Velugu, Express, Deluxe, Super Luxury, Rajadhani A/C, Garuda, Garuda Plus and Vennela A/C Sleeper.

Platforms

References

External links 

 

Transport in Telangana
Bus stations in Telangana
Transport in Hyderabad, India
Buildings and structures in Hyderabad, India
Establishments in Hyderabad State